Ian Ewen-Street (born 1949) is a New Zealand politician. He was a member of the Green Party and a Member of the New Zealand Parliament for the Greens from 1999 to 2005. He has been prominent in advocacy for organic farming, organic gardening and biosecurity in New Zealand.

Political career

His list ranking of 52 was far too low to enter Parliament as a list MP.

He first entered Parliament as a list MP in the 1999 election, having been ranked third on the newly independent Green Party's party list. He was re-elected in the 2002 election. In June 2004, however, he announced that he would be retiring from politics at the next election, saying that the birth of his daughter meant that he wanted to spend more time at home.

In August 2006, Ewen-Street joined the National Party, saying his passion for the environment hasn't changed, but he believes more progress can be made through a major party such as National.

Personal life
Ewen-Street was in a relationship with Sue Grey, a Nelson lawyer. Ewen-Street resigned from parliament when he fell in love with Grey while she was appearing before his select committee on the scampi inquiry. Ewen-Street laid a police complaint when Grey was fired from the Department of Conservation, alleging judicial misconduct.

In 2003 Ewen-Street divorced Margaret O'Brien, his wife of 16 years, and had a daughter with Grey named Ysabella; Grey had two children from a previous relationship.

References

1949 births
Living people
Green Party of Aotearoa New Zealand MPs
New Zealand National Party politicians
Alliance (New Zealand political party) politicians
New Zealand list MPs
Members of the New Zealand House of Representatives
Unsuccessful candidates in the 1996 New Zealand general election
21st-century New Zealand politicians
Organic farmers